Henry C. Christians (June 16, 1862 – February 27, 1945) was an American businessman and politician.

Born in the town of Aztalan, Jefferson County, Wisconsin, Christians owned a creamery and an egg and butter cold storage business in Johnson Creek, Wisconsin. He also served as president of the Farmers and Merchants Bank of Jefferson. Christians served as the Azlatan town clerk and postmaster of Johnson Creek. Christians was a Democrat. In 1895, Christians served in the Wisconsin State Assembly. Christians retired in 1942 and moved to Los Angeles, California. He died at his home in Los Angeles, California.

Notes

1862 births
1945 deaths
People from Aztalan, Wisconsin
Businesspeople from Wisconsin
Wisconsin postmasters
People from Johnson Creek, Wisconsin
Democratic Party members of the Wisconsin State Assembly